The 1981–82 Bundesliga was the 19th season of the Bundesliga, West Germany's premier football league. It began on 8 August 1981 and ended on 29 May 1982. Bayern Munich were the defending champions.

Competition modus
Every team played two games against each other team, one at home and one away. Teams received two points for a win and one point for a draw. If two or more teams were tied on points, places were determined by goal difference and, if still tied, by goals scored. The team with the most points were crowned champions while the two teams with the fewest points were relegated to 2. Bundesliga. The third-to-last team had to compete in a two-legged relegation/promotion play-off against the third-placed team from 2. Bundesliga.

Team changes to 1980–81
TSV 1860 Munich, FC Schalke 04 and Bayer 05 Uerdingen were relegated to the 2. Bundesliga after finishing in the last three places. They were replaced by SV Werder Bremen, winners of the 2. Bundesliga Northern Division, SV Darmstadt 98, winners of the Southern Division and Eintracht Braunschweig, who won a two-legged promotion play-off against Kickers Offenbach.

Season overview

Team overview

League table

Results

Relegation play-offs
Bayer Leverkusen and third-placed 2. Bundesliga team Kickers Offenbach had to compete in a two-legged relegation/promotion play-off. Leverkusen won 3–1 on aggregate and thus remained in the Bundesliga.

Top goalscorers
27 goals
  Horst Hrubesch (Hamburger SV)

22 goals
  Manfred Burgsmüller (Borussia Dortmund)

21 goals
  Dieter Hoeneß (FC Bayern Munich)

18 goals
  Paul Breitner (FC Bayern Munich)
  Uwe Reinders (SV Werder Bremen)

17 goals
  Ronald Worm (Eintracht Braunschweig)

16 goals
  Peter Cestonaro (SV Darmstadt 98)

15 goals
  Pierre Littbarski (1. FC Köln)
  Norbert Meier (SV Werder Bremen)
  Kurt Pinkall (Borussia Mönchengladbach)
  Tony Woodcock (1. FC Köln)

Champion squad

See also
 1981–82 2. Bundesliga
 1981–82 DFB-Pokal

References

External links
 DFB Bundesliga archive 1981/1982

Bundesliga seasons
1
Germany